Malbaie may refer to:

 La Malbaie, a town in Quebec, Canada
 Hautes-Gorges-de-la-Rivière-Malbaie National Park, Quebec, Canada
 Malbaie River, a tributary of the St. Lawrence River in Quebec, Canada
 Malbaie Lake (La Côte-de-Beaupré), a waterbody crossed by Malbaie River, in La Côte-de-Beaupré and Charlevoix Regional County Municipality, in Quebec, Canada
 Saint-Georges-de-Malbaie, Quebec, a community in Quebec, Canada
 HMCS La Malbaie, a 1942 Royal Canadian Navy revised Flower-class corvette, in Canada
 Malbaie Formation, a geologic formation in Quebec, Canada

See also 
 Malba (disambiguation)